Silent Sanderson is a 1925 American silent Western film featuring Harry Carey.

Plot
As described in a film magazine review, Joel had loved Judith but had given her up to his brother, who asked her to marry him. The brother is found dead, slumped over a letter addressed to Judith, two days prior to their wedding day. Jim Downing, who had displayed his wealth to Judith and persuades her to marry him, had killed the brother. Joel, downhearted, goes to the Klondike to forget his trouble where he becomes known as Silent Sanderson. One year there makes him wealthy. Judith, disillusioned by her marriage to Jim, goes to the Klondike to become a dancer. Sanderson (Joel) hosts the crowd one night at the cafe because of his new claim, when Judith is attacked by a stranger. Joel protects her and takes her to his home, telling her that he will send her back South when the ice breaks. His hatred of her has remained during the time they have been apart. She tries to restore within him the love he once had for her, but fails. Wolves attack Joel and Judith saves him through dexterous use of a rifle. She nurses him through a long recovery. At the end of that time, Jim Downing wanders to Joel's house, suffering from snow blindness, searching for Judith. Not knowing the identity of his hosts, he is nursed back to health. Not revealing that he has recovered his eyesight, he suddenly attacks Joel. Judith again protects Joel. Desiring to end their struggle using their fists, Joel piles blows onto the man until he stumbles back out into the snow. There wolves set upon Jim and devour him. Joel and Judith find themselves together and are married.

Cast
 Harry Carey as Joel Parsons / Silent Sanderson
 Trilby Clark as Judith Bensonn
 John Miljan as Jim Downing
 Gardner James as Art Parsons
 Edith Yorke as Mrs. Parsons
 Stanton Heck as Silver Smith
 Sheldon Lewis as Single Tooth Wilson

See also
 Harry Carey filmography

References

External links
 
 

1925 films
1925 Western (genre) films
American black-and-white films
Films directed by Scott R. Dunlap
Producers Distributing Corporation films
Silent American Western (genre) films
1920s American films